The 1984 Porsche Grand Prix was a women's tennis tournament played on outdoor hard courts in Filderstadt, West Germany that was part of the 1984 Virginia Slims World Championship Series. It was the seventh edition of the tournament and was held from 15 October until 21 October 1984. Unseeded Catarina Lindqvist won the singles title.

Finals

Singles
 Catarina Lindqvist defeated  Steffi Graf 6–1, 6–4
 It was Lindqvist's 2nd title of the year and of her career.

Doubles
 Claudia Kohde-Kilsch /  Helena Suková defeated  Bettina Bunge /  Eva Pfaff 6–2, 4–6, 6–3
 It was Kohde-Kilsch's 4th title of the year and the 10th of her career. It was Suková's 3rd title of the year and the 4th of her career.

References

External links
 
 ITF tournament edition details
 Tournament draws

Porsche Grand Prix
Porsche Tennis Grand Prix
Porsche Grand Prix
Porsche Grand Prix
1980s in Baden-Württemberg
Porsch